A gotra is equivalent to a lineage, akin to a family name, but the given name of a family is often different from its gotra, and may reflect the traditional occupation, place of residence or other important family characteristic rather than the lineage.

People belonging to a particular gotra may not be of the same caste (as there are many gotras which are part of different castes) in the Hindu social system. However, there is a notable exception among matrilineal Tulu speakers, for whom the lineages are the same across the castes.

People of the same gotra are generally not allowed to marry. At weddings, the gotras of the bride and the groom are read aloud to verify that they are not breaking this rule.

Main Brahmin Gotras 
A list of major Brahmin gotras according to the Sutras:
 Bhr̥gu (Jamadagni)
 Bhārgava
 Cyāvana
 Aurva
 Jāmadagnya
 Vātsa
 Kevala Bhr̥gu
 Bhārgava
 Daivodāsa
 Vainya
 Pārtha
 Śaunaka
 Gārtsamada
 Gautama
 Āṅgirasa
 Gautama
 Kākṣīvata
 Dairghatamasa
 Auśanasa
 Bharadvāja
 Āṅgirasa
 Bārhaspatya
 Bhāradvāja
 Gārgya
 Kevala Aṅgiras
 Āṅgirasa
 Āmbarīṣa
 Māndhātra
 Kautsa
 Kāṇva
 Maudgalya
 Sāṁkr̥tya
 Śāktya
 Atri
 Ātreya
 Viśvāmitra
 Vaiśvāmitra
 Daivarāta
 Mādhucchandasa
 Kauśika
 Gāthina
 Aindra
 Kaśyapa
 Kāśyapa
 Āvatsāra
 Āsita
 Śāṇḍila
 Daivala
 Vāsiṣṭha
 Vasiṣṭha
 Vāsiṣṭha
 Maitrāvaruṇa
 Aupamanyava
 Pārāśarya
 Śāktya
 Sāṁkr̥tya
 Agastya
 Āgastya

References

Indian castes
Gotras
Kinship and descent
Indian culture-related lists